The Orient Bridge, which spans the Kettle River between Ferry County, Washington and Stevens County, Washington, was built in 1909. It was listed on the National Register of Historic Places.

It brings Richardson Road across the river.

The old bridge was apparently replaced by a new bridge in 1993.

See also
List of bridges documented by the Historic American Engineering Record in Washington (state)
List of bridges on the National Register of Historic Places in Washington (state)

References

External links

Bridges completed in 1909
Bridges in Washington (state)
Historic American Engineering Record in Washington (state)
National Register of Historic Places in Stevens County, Washington